The batangas or batangas malapad, is a sword originating from the Tagalog people of the Philippines. It is a type of bolo that widens near the tip.

See also
  Pirah
  Weapons of Moroland

References

Blade weapons
Machetes
Filipino swords
Weapons of the Philippines